The first municipal council in Qatar was formed in the early 1950s and it was reorganized in 1956. Doha municipality came into being in May 1963. The Ministry of Municipal Affairs was established in 1972 as a government body responsible for supervising the functions of municipalities.

Decree No 4 for 1963 organized, for the first time, the election and appointment of the members of the municipal council. Law No 11 for 1963 followed. It stipulated that the municipal council is formed by a decree and that the appointment of the members is based on the nomination of the Minister of Municipal Affairs and Agriculture. The first joint meeting of municipal councils in the country was held in 1983. Most of the credit goes to this meeting in deciding to form a central municipal council to replace the numerous municipal councils.

The council consists of 29-member civic body which has a four-year term and has representatives from all the 29 civic constituencies in the country.

Introduction
In 1952, the first municipal council was formed, and was restructured in 1956. Doha municipal council was formed in May 1963, after the government conceded to protests by nationalist movements. It was the first ever municipal council which was designed to elect members. In 1972, the Municipalital Affairs was established, functioning as a supervisory authority over the municipal affairs.

The idea to form the municipal council by direct elections was revived when the Emir of Qatar Hamad bin Khalifa Al Thani decreed Law No 12 for 1998 which issued the election of the members of the Central Municipal Council. The emir also issued the Emiri Decree No 17 for 1998 on the election of the members of the Central Municipal Council. Several committees were subsequently formed. They included the legal, security, and information, technical, supply, and follow up committees. A preparatory committee was also formed under the patronage of the wife of the Emir to carry out an awareness program for women, emphasizing the importance of their participation in the elections both as candidates and voters.

The election experience was very well received publicly and officially and the response was overwhelming by all sectors of the Qatari society, males and females alike. The participation of women as voters and candidates invited a wide-range and favorable echo, locally and internationally. 35 Arab and foreign parliamentarians were hosted to oversee the conduct of the first elections in the country.

The Qatari democratic practice exceeded the surrounding experiences in four aspects: voting age was brought down to 18, which expands the scope of participation in the democratic process, the Qatari media was utilized in an unprecedented manner in the Persian Gulf region by giving live coverage of the debates and discussions between candidates and voters, women were allowed to participate as voters and candidates for the first time and a headquarters was provided in each constituency, where the 29 members of the Council can hold discussions and meetings with their electorates.

Voting Regulations
The Emiri Decree No 17 for 1998 specified the regulations governing the elections of the members of the Central Municipal Council. All Qatari males and females that fulfill the following conditions have the right to cast their votes: 
 They must be of Qatari origin, or have been naturalized citizens for a period of at least 15 years.
 They must be 18 years of age.
 They must not be indicted on a criminal charge of breach of trust or honesty. Otherwise they must have been rehabilitated.
 The constituency must be the real place of residence for respective voters.
 They must not be members of the armed forces or security forces.

The Council is formed of 29 members representing constituencies spreading over 230 regions in the State of Qatar. The membership term in the Council is 4 years.

The Council Sessions
On 4 May 1999 Sheikh Hamad Bin Khalifa Al-Thani, the Emir of the State of Qatar issued a decree inviting the Central Municipal Council to hold its first meeting in full attendance to elect the Council's Chairman and Deputy Chairman from among its members by secret ballot.
The Council holds its ordinary meetings in Doha and in public once every two weeks. Extraordinary meetings must be requested by one third of the members. The meetings are considered regular only where the quorum of two thirds of the members is available. The maximum period for which a meeting can be put off for lack of quorum is three days, after which the meeting can be held with the attendance of one third of the members. 
The Council issues its resolutions by plurality of votes. Under the supervision of the Chairman, the Council forms a Secretariat General and appoint a Secretary General. The job of the Secretary General is to prepare the meetings' agenda and submit thereof to the Chairman, record the minutes of the meetings and the Council's recommendations and submit, to the Minister of Municipal Affairs and Agriculture, those parts of the recommendations that call for his or any higher authority's action.

The Council's Authorities
The Central Municipal Council is an independent entity. The Ministry of Municipal Affairs and Agriculture has no authority over its functions. It is totally free to practice its responsibilities without any interference from the Ministry. The roles of the Ministry and the Council complement each other. The role of the Council is still one of advisory and monitoring. The Council has the right to discuss all matters and problems, and its agenda is not confined to what is raised by the Ministry. The Ministry approves the recommendations of the Council, whose members decide their own work program and budget without external interference.

Both the Ministry of Municipal Affairs and Agriculture and the Central Municipal Council coordinate their efforts to reach the common goal of serving the country and the citizens. The Minister of Municipal Affairs and Agriculture explains the different points of view to the Council through a specialized committee. In case the difference in opinion persists, subjects of discord, accompanied by the two different viewpoints, are raised to the Council of Ministers for consideration.

The 29 members of the Council focus their attention on providing the compelling needs of the society and securing the basic services with a view to rationalize spending. They do that through a well-defined plan and good coordination of time, effort and resources, and through giving priority to projects like road building, sanitary drainage, parks and recreation sites.

Central Municipal Council Secretary General
The secretary-general of the Central Municipal Council is to be appointed by the State Cabinet and his powers are to be specified by it. 
This authority was earlier held by Minister of Municipality and Urban Planning. The Advisory Council earlier made extensive recommendations to amend Law No. 12 and incorporate the above changes. The job of the Secretary General is to prepare the meetings' agenda and submit thereof to the Chairman, record the minutes of the meetings and the Council's recommendations and submit, to the Minister of Municipal Affairs and Agriculture, those parts of the recommendations that call for his or any higher authority's action.

Central Municipal Council contest requirements
The law (No. 1 of 2011) was issued by the Deputy Emir and Heir Apparent, Sheikh Tamim bin Hamad Al Thani, on Thursday 20 January 2011.
The legislation amends Law No. 12 of 1998 regulating the Central Municipal Counciland the amendments were made on the recommendations of the Advisory Council. It is, however, not known if all the recommendations of the Advisory Council have been incorporated in the new legislation.

Age Limit
Qatar has raised the minimum age limit to 30 years from 25 for its citizens to contest Central Municipal Council elections.
It was argued by the Advisory Council that since a man or woman is generally in a position to hold social responsibility only when he or she is 30, the minimum age to contest the CMC be raised to 30 years.

Place of residence
The Advisory Council's recommendation that a Central Municipal Council member must live in the constituency he represents is because he should be aware of local issues and knows local people. The new law also makes it mandatory for a candidate to contest from the constituency he is a permanent resident of and his name appears on the local voters' list. After a contestant wins the election, he or she needs to continue residing in the same constituency.

Employments
Members of the Advisory Council also suggested in their recommendations that no citizen who is employed with the police, paramilitary or defence forces or any government department be allowed to contest the Central Municipal Council poll.

Election results

1st Municipal Council Elections in 1999
248 candidates including 6 women contested the 4-year term of 29 seats. Polling date was set for Monday 8 March 1999, and 21,995 eligible males and females registered to cast their votes in their respective constituencies.

2nd Municipal Council Elections in 2003
The Ministry of Interior announced in 7 April 2003, the final results of the elections of the second Central Municipal Council in which 25 members out of 88 candidates won and 4 members including a woman were elected unopposed. Nearly 40% of the total voters of 21024 exercised their franchise. Sheikha Yousuf Hasan Al Jufairi was the first lady to win the elections.

3rd Municipal Council Elections in 2007

The third session of the central municipal council elections were held on April 1, 2007 with the participation of 51.1%, of the electorate. 13,656 out of 28,153 eligible voters cast their ballots in 27 constituencies to choose 27 members from 116 candidates.

Three women were elected in 2007.  One was reelected to her Old Airport constituency with the highest number of votes of all candidates; and two won unchallenged.

 Chairman: Nassir bin Abdullah Saeed Al- Amer Al-Kaabi.
 Vice-Chairman: Jassem Abdullah Jassem Al-Malki.

 Al Jasrah: Tariq Saif Ali Saad Al-Kaabi,
 Ad Dawhah al Jadidah : Jassem Abdullah Jassem al-Malki,
 Al Markhiya: Ibrahim Abdullah Hassan al-Ibrahim,
 Madinat Khalifa North: Abdullah Naser Al-Kahtani,
 Madinat Khalifa South: Mohammed Shaheen Rashid Al-Ateeq Al-Doseri,
 Bin Omran: Ali Ahmed Ali Al-Kuwari,
 Al-Salata Al-Jadeeda: Abdullah Saeed Abdullah Khamees Al-Sulaiti,
 Al Hilal: Mohammed Abdulhammed Saeed Naser Allah,
 Airport - Old Airport: Sheikha Yousuf Hasan Al Jufairi
 Al Wakrah:Hassan Abbas Hassan Abdurahim,
 Mesaieed: Saeed Ali Hamed Al-Meri,
 Abu Hamour: Hamed Rashid Mohammed Al-Nabet,
 New Ghanem: Hamed Khalid Ahmed Mohamad Al-Ghanem,
 Al Murrah: Saeed Naser Hamed Al-Awamy Al-Marri,
 Muaither: Mohammed Ali Mohammed Al-Athba,
 Merreikh: Hamed Salem Mohammed Al-Meri,
 North Muaither: Saud Abdullah Hamad Abdullah al-Henzab,
 New Ar Rayyan: Mohamed Humoud Shafi al-Shafi,
 Old Ar Rayyan: Hamed Saleh Hamed Al-Hawal,
 Al Nasraniya: Mohamed Saleh Rashed al-Khiyareen al-Hajari,
 Al Gharafa: Mubarak Fresh Mubarak Saleh Salem, 
 Umm Salal Ali: Mohammed Khamis Jamaan Al-Ali,
 Kharaitiyat: Ali Naser Issa Al-Kaabi, 
 Al-Shahaniya: Shahir Saud Shahir al- Namasi Al-Shammari,
 Dukhan: Rashid Abdulhadi Talib Al-Shahwani Al-Hajri,
 Al Khor: Saqer Saeed Al-Muhanadi,
 Al Thakhira: Ali Hassan Juma al-Hassan al-Mohannadi,
 Madinat ash Shamal: Saad Ali Hassan al-Naoimy
 Al Ghuwariyah: Nassir Abdullah Saeed Al- Amer Al-Kaabi.

4th Municipal Council Elections in 2011 

The number of registered voters reached 32662 while the numbers of the total contestants were 101 including 4 women. From the total 29 constituencies, the voting was conducted in 27 while the candidates of other two constituencies such as Msaeid and Shahhaniyya were elected unopposed. In total, 13606 voters cast their votes in the 4th edition of the Central Municipal Council with a percentage of 43.3% from total number of voters.
 Al Jasrah: Mr. Tariq Saif Ali Al Malky
 Ad Dawhah al Jadidah: Mr. Jassim Abdullah Jassim Al Malky
 Al Markhiya: Mr. Mohammed Jassim Nasser Al Musalmani
 Madinat Khalifa North: Mr. Hamad Khalid Khaleefa Al Kubaisi
 Madinat Khalifa South: Mr. Muhammed Shaheen Rashid Al Dosari
 Bin Umran: Mr. Ali Shaheen Matar Al Kuwari
 New Al Salata: Mr. Abdullah Saeed Abdullah Al Sulaiti
 Al Hilal: Mr. Mishal Hasan Muhammed Al Dahneim
 Airport: Sheikha Yousuf Hasan Al Jufairi
 Al Wakrah: Mr. Hassan Abbas Hassan Abul Raheem
 Mesaieed: Mr. Saeed Ali Hamad Al Murri
 Abu Hammour: Mr. Salih Jabir Salih Al Murri
 Ganim Al Jadeed: Mr. Hamad Khalid Ahmed Al Ghanim
 Al Murrah: Mr. Salih Rashid Hamad Jarallah
 Muaither: Mr. Muhammad Ali Muhammed Al Azba
 Murreikh: Mr. Muhammed Salim Muhammed Al Murri
 Muaither North: Mr. Saoud Abdullah Hamad Al Hanzab
 New Ar Rayyan: Mr. Muhammed Hamoud Shafi Al Shafi
 Old Ar Rayyan: Mr. Hamad Salih Hamad Al Hawal
 Al Nasraniya: Mr. Muhammed Salih Rashid Al Hajeri
 Al Gharafa: Mr. Mubarak Furaish Mubarak Salih
 Umm Salal: Mr. Ahmed Ibrahim Sultan Al Sheib
 Al Khuraithiyath: Mr. Hamad Hadi Hamad Al Murri
 Al-Shahaniya: Mr. Muhammed Dhafir Muhammed Al Hajeri
 Dukhan: Mr. Muhammed Faisal Mubarak Al Shahwani
 Al Khor: Mr. Saqr Saeed Salim Al Muhannadi
 Al Thakhira: Mr. Hamad Lahdan Ali Al Muhannadi
 Shamal: Mr. Saad Ali Hassan Al Nuaimi
 Al Ghuwariyah: Mr. Saeed Mubarak Saeed Al Rashidi

5th Municipal Council Elections in 2015

Five women contested the 2015 polls as candidates. Two women were elected to the CMC after winning their constituencies, heralding the first time two women have occupied seats in the council.

The 2015 elections witnessed the merging of a number of depopulated constituencies and the addition of several new constituencies.

6th Municipal Council Elections in 2019

The 2019 elections were held on 16 April 2019. The official number of people who voted is 13,334, about 1/13th of the Qatari population, and nine percent lower than in 2015.

References

Elections in Qatar